Glaphyrina caudata is a species of large sea snail, a marine gastropod mollusc in the family Fasciolariidae.

Distribution
This species is endemic to New Zealand.

Habitat
This sea snail is found in shallow water to depths of about 110 m.

Shell description
Shell rather small, elongated fusiform, solid, with a moderately long canal. Sculpture consisting of subequal narrow spiral cords,
about 10 on the penultimate whorl, the interspaces shallow, much broader than the cords upon the base, where they have a fine spiral thread; axial sculpture formed by numerous vertical broadly rounded ribs, 15 to 20 on the body whorl, where they become obsolete below the periphery. Colour light - yellowish, the spirals reddish - brown. Spire elevated conic, of the same height as the aperture with canal; outlines straight. Protoconch of 2 smooth whorls, small and globose. Whorls 8, regularly increasing, convex, very lightly shouldered, the last somewhat inflated; base excavated. Suture not much impressed. Aperture large, oval, broadly angled above, produced below into a fairly long oblique and open canal, rounded at the base. Outer lip convex, sharp, lightly lirate inside. Columella subvertical, slightly concave. Inner lip narrow, spreading over the parietal wall, narrowed below, and forming the inner edge of the canal. Operculum unknown.

The shell height is up to 49.5 mm, and width up to 21 mm.

References
This article incorporates public domain text from reference.

 Powell, A.W.B. (1934). Upper Pliocene fossils from Cape Runaway. Records of the Auckland Institute and Museum. 1: 261-274.
 Spencer, H.G., Marshall, B.A. & Willan, R.C. (2009). Checklist of New Zealand living Mollusca. Pp 196-219. in: Gordon, D.P. (ed.) New Zealand inventory of biodiversity. Volume one. Kingdom Animalia: Radiata, Lophotrochozoa, Deuterostomia. Canterbury University Press, Christchurch.
 Maxwell, P.A. (2009). Cenozoic Mollusca. Pp 232-254 in Gordon, D.P. (ed.) New Zealand inventory of biodiversity. Volume one. Kingdom Animalia: Radiata, Lophotrochozoa, Deuterostomia. Canterbury University Press, Christchurch.

External links
 Quoy J.R.C. & Gaimard J.P. (1832-1835). Voyage de découvertes de l'"Astrolabe" exécuté par ordre du Roi, pendant les années 1826-1829, sous le commandement de M. J. Dumont d'Urville. Zoologie. 1: i-l, 1-264; 2(1): 1-321 [1832; 2(2): 321-686 [1833]; 3(1): 1-366 [1834]; 3(2): 367-954 [1835]; Atlas (Mollusques): pls 1-93 [1833]. Paris: Tastu]
 Sowerby, G. B., II. (1842-1887). Thesaurus Conchyliorum: Or monographs of genera of shells. London, privately published: vol. 1: p. 1-438, pl. 1-91 [cover date 1847; vol. 2: p. 439 899, pl. 92-186 [cover date 1855]; vol. 3: p. 1-331, pl. 187-290 [cover date: 1866]; vol. 4 p. 1-110, pl. 292-423 [cover date 1880]; vol. 5: p. 1-305, pl. 424-517 [cover date 1887] - Details of dates in Petit R.E. 2009 Zootaxa 2189: 35-37; dates of different parts behind cover page of volume I in the copy of BHL]
 Finlay H.J. (1926). A further commentary on New Zealand molluscan systematics. Transactions of the New Zealand Institute. 57: 320-485, pls 18-23

Fasciolariidae
Gastropods of New Zealand
Gastropods described in 1833